Robert McPherson Cross was a Scottish amateur footballer who played in the Scottish League for Queen's Park as a centre half. He was capped by Scotland at amateur level.

References 

Scottish footballers
Queen's Park F.C. players
Scottish Football League players
Scotland amateur international footballers
1914 births
Footballers from Glasgow
Year of death missing
Place of death missing
Association football midfielders